Thallarcha chrysochoa, the golden footman, is a moth in the subfamily Arctiinae. It was described by Edward Meyrick in 1886. It is found in Australia, where it has been recorded from the Australian Capital Territory, New South Wales and Victoria.

The wingspan is about 20 mm. The forewings are yellow with black zigzag lines and markings. The hindwings are yellow with a black mark near the middle and a black band along the margin.

References

Moths described in 1886
Lithosiini